The 1901 Ohio Medical football team was an American football team that represented the Ohio Medical University in the 1901 college football season.  Ohio Medical compiled a 5–3–1 record, and outscored their opponents 85 to 57.

Schedule

References

Ohio Medical
Ohio Medical football seasons
Ohio Medical football